Kajitani (written: 梶谷) is a Japanese surname. Notable people with the surname include:

Alex Kajitani, American educator
, Japanese gymnast
, Japanese baseball player
Naomi Kajitani (梶谷 直美, born 1967), Japanese famous Actress

Japanese-language surnames